László Andor (born 3 June 1966 in Zalaegerszeg) is a Hungarian economist. From 2010 to 2014 he was Commissioner for Employment, Social Affairs and Inclusion in the Barroso II administration of the European Commission. From 2005 to 2010 he was a Member of the Board of Directors of the European Bank for Reconstruction and Development (EBRD), representing the Czech Republic, Croatia, Hungary and Slovakia.

He studied Economics at the Corvinus University of Budapest (then called the Karl Marx University), and later became Associate Professor of Economic Policy at the same institution. He also studied at the George Washington University in Washington, D.C. and in 1993 earned a master's degree in Development Economics at the University of Manchester. Since 1993, he has been editor of a progressive (leftist) Hungarian quarterly social science journal, Eszmélet (Consciousness). Since 2003, he has been a member of the board of the Economic Section of the Hungarian Socialist Party.

He was once appointed Acting Commissioner for Consumer Protection in Neven Mimica's stead, from 19 April 2014 – 25 May 2014 while he was on electoral campaign leave for the 2014 elections to the European Parliament. He ultimately decided to not take up his seat. László Andor is a member of the member of the advisory board of the Prague European Summit.

Personal life
He is married. His wife is Erika Varsányi. They have three children.

References

External links 
 Laszlo Andor Official Media Gallery
 European Commission – Biographies of Commissioner-designates, Laszlo Andor
 EUobserver interview of 7 December 2009: Everyone says I am an unusual choice

|-

1966 births
Living people
People from Zalaegerszeg
Corvinus University of Budapest alumni
George Washington University alumni
Alumni of the University of Manchester
Hungarian European Commissioners
20th-century Hungarian economists
Articles containing video clips
21st-century Hungarian economists